The Opal-I is a multi-purpose fully amphibious armoured personnel carrier developed and produced by HSW S.A. in Poland. APC is a development of MT-LB that was produced in HSW under licence. Major changes are reworked nose section and fitted propellers for better floating speed and manoeuvrability, new turret with 12.7 mm NSVT machine-gun instead of old one with 7.62 PKT and powered-up engine. Opal-II is a stretched variant with longer chassis with 7 road wheels on each side, like the 2S1 and MT-LBu and 300 hp (220 kW) SW680T engine.

Variants

WPT Mors
(WPT for Wóz Pogotowia Technicznego - lit. Technical Support Vehicle) - armoured recovery and repair vehicle with light crane, hydraulic dozerblade, welding equipment and an NBC detection system. The vehicle is a basic support vehicle of mechanized battalions equipped with BMP-1 IFV in Polish Land Forces.

TRI Hors
(TRI for Transporter Rozpoznania Inżynieryjnego - lit. Engineering Reconnaissance Vehicle) - engineering vehicle with basic equipment. In use with Polish Land Forces.

TRI-D Durian
It's TRI Hors additionally equipped with trailer-mounted UZR-3 mine clearing system. In use with Polish Land Forces.

ISM Kroton
(ISM for Inżynieryjny System Minowania – lit. Engineer Minelaying System, Kroton is Polish for Croton) - Opal-II based engineer vehicle with mine-scattering system UMN mounted on a cargo bed. UMN consists of 4 launchers, each with 20 launch containers for anti-personnel or anti-tank mines. The ISM has a crew of 2 and a combat weight of 15.25 tonnes. It entered service with Polish Land Forces in 2004.

WEM Lotos
Armoured ambulance vehicle. In service with Polish Land Forces.

ZWD-10R Łowcza-3
(ZWD for Zautomatyzowany Wóz Dowodzenia – lit. Automatic Command Vehicle) - Opal-I based air defence command vehicle equipped with Łowcza system. The troop compartment section of vehicle is higher than in standard vehicle. Also known as LA-3. Vehicle is used by Polish Land Forces.

LSPZRA Sopel
(LSPZRA for lekki samobieżny przeciwlotniczy zestaw rakietowo-artyleryjski – lit. light, self-propelled, anti-aircraft, combined gun and missile system; Sopel is Polish for Icicle) - air defence variant armed with twin 23 mm cannon and two 9M32M "Strela-2M" surface to air missiles. Vehicle designed as air-defence vehicle for mechanized units. Only prototype.

LSPZRA Stalagmit
(Stalagmit is Polish for Stalagmite) - development of Sopel, based on Opal-II, armed with ELOP turret with two 23 mm Model-4216 guns and 4 Grom surface to air missiles. This variant was equipped with more advanced guiding systems. Only prototype.

Bor
Ammunition re-supply vehicle for artillery units. Only prototype.

References

Tracked armoured personnel carriers
Armoured personnel carriers of Poland
Amphibious armoured personnel carriers
Tracked amphibious vehicles